James Barron (1769–1851) was an officer in the U.S. Navy.

James Barron may also refer to:
 James Barron (cricketer) (1900–1990), New Zealand cricketer
 James Barron (footballer) (1913–1969), English footballer
 James Barron (harbour engineer) (1842–1929), Scottish harbour designer
 James Barron (journalist) (born 1955), reporter for The New York Times
 Jim Barron (born 1943), English footballer

See also
 James Baron (disambiguation)
 James Barroun (died 1569), Scottish merchant